Denis Viktorovich Klyuyev (born 8 September 1973) is a Russian football manager and former Soviet and Russian midfielder. He is the manager of FC Ural-2 Yekaterinburg.

Honours
 Russian Cup winner: 1995, 2004
 Belgian First Division winner: 1997

References

1973 births
Living people
Russian footballers
Association football midfielders
Russia youth international footballers
Russia under-21 international footballers
FC Asmaral Moscow players
Russian Premier League players
FC Dynamo Moscow players
Feyenoord players
Lierse S.K. players
FC Schalke 04 players
FC Shinnik Yaroslavl players
FC Akhmat Grozny players
Eredivisie players
Belgian Pro League players
Russian expatriate footballers
Russian expatriate sportspeople in the Netherlands
Expatriate footballers in the Netherlands
Russian expatriate sportspeople in Belgium
Expatriate footballers in Belgium
Russian expatriate sportspeople in Germany
Expatriate footballers in Germany
Russian expatriate sportspeople in Kazakhstan
Expatriate footballers in Kazakhstan
Russian football managers
FC Torpedo Moscow players
FC MVD Rossii Moscow players
FC Spartak-MZhK Ryazan players